The Sony Vaio C Series is a discontinued series of notebook computers from Sony introduced in September 2006 as the consumer alternative follow-up to the then current SZ series.

History
Like the SZ, the first C series featured a 1280x800 (16:10 widescreen) 13.3" LCD screen, plus Core 2 Duo CPUs; later 15.5" models were released. As a consumer laptop, a variety of colours were offered, while compared with the SZ, the C series was heavier, and lacked the switchable graphics option, instead offering either lower-power Intel GMA 950 or faster Nvidia GeForce 7400 graphics. A crocodile-skin option was offered in Japan. 

The C series was superseded by the SR series.

Models

The 13" 2006 C series weighed 5.1 pounds/2.3kg.

External links
http://www.sonystyle.com/cseries - official page

References

C